Aneesur Rahman (24 August 1927 – 6 June 1987) pioneered the application of computational methods to physical systems.  His 1964 paper  on liquid argon studied a system of 864 argon atoms on a CDC 3600 computer, using a Lennard-Jones potential.  His algorithms still form the basis for many codes written today.  Moreover, he worked on a wide variety of problems, such as the microcanonical ensemble approach to lattice gauge theory, which he invented  with David J E Callaway.

Aneesur Rahman was a native of Hyderabad, India. He earned his undergraduate degree in physics and mathematics from Cambridge University in England and his Ph.D. in theoretical physics from Louvain University in Belgium. In 1960, Dr. Rahman began a 25-year tenure as a physicist at the Argonne National Laboratory (Argonne, Ill.) (operated by the University of Chicago). In 1985, Dr. Rahman joined the faculty at the University of Minnesota as a professor of physics and fellow at the Supercomputer Institute.

Dr. Rahman is known as the father of molecular dynamics, a discipline of physics that utilizes computers to simulate microscopic behavior of physical systems. In 1977 Dr. Rahman was awarded the Irving Langmuir Prize by the American Physical Society.  Enrico Fermi's Group (at Los Alamos during the 1950s), George Vineyard's group (radiation damage studies at Brookhaven in 1960), as well as Tom Wainwright and Berni Alder's group (at the Livermore Radiation Laboratory in the 1950s) developed generalized leapfrog and event-driven molecular dynamics algorithms a bit earlier than Rahman.  Berni Alder received a National Medal of Science award from President Obama in 2009.

The American Physical Society annually awards the Aneesur Rahman Prize for outstanding achievement in computational research. First awarded in 1993, the Aneesur Rahman Prize is the highest honour in the field of computational physics given by the American Physical Society.

Argonne National Laboratory offers a special postdoctoral fellowship named after Aneesur Rahman to be awarded internationally on an annual basis to an outstanding doctoral scientist who is at an early point in a promising career.

For a series of tributes to Aneesur Rahman, see https://www.cecam.org/themes/cecam/assets/images/history/1981-1990/In_Memoriam_Aneesur_Rahman.pdf

References

1927 births
1987 deaths
20th-century Indian Muslims
20th-century Indian physicists
Scientists from Hyderabad, India
Alumni of the University of Cambridge
Scientific computing researchers
Fellows of the American Physical Society